Thrincophora inconcisana is a moth of the  family Tortricidae. It is found in Australia (including Queensland and New South Wales).

References

Moths described in 1863
Archipini